Fecri Ebcioğlu (2 March 1927 – 6 March 1989) was a Turkish songwriter, composer, music arranger, DJ, singer and former goalkeeper of Fenerbahçe.

References 

Turkish footballers
Association football goalkeepers
Turkish lyricists
Turkish television presenters
1989 deaths
1927 births